The Symphony No. 3 in A major, Op. 55, is a four-movement orchestral composition by the Finnish composer Leevi Madetoja, who wrote the piece from 1925–26 while vacationing in Paris, before returning to Helsinki, Finland to complete the work. Optimistic and pastorale in character, the symphony is today considered one of the finest symphonies in the post-Sibelian, Finnish orchestral canon; indeed, a "masterpiece ... equal in stature" to Sibelius's seven essays in the form. Although technically his penultimate symphonic composition (a fourth symphony was lost and thus never completed), the Third is nonetheless—due to its successor's fate—Madetoja's final addition to the repertoire.

The Helsinki Philharmonic Orchestra premiered the new symphony in Helsinki on 8 April 1926 under the composer's baton. Although Madetoja received the usual praise, the new piece admittedly perplexed its audience, which had expected a dramatic, patriotic statement similar to those its two monumental predecessors, the Second Symphony (1918) and The Ostrobothnians (1924), had made; the Third Symphony's (subsequent) significance thus eluded nearly everyone.

History 
After the success of The Ostrobothnians, Madetoja departed for France, staying for six months in Houilles, a small town just outside of Paris. Here, in the quiet of the Parisian suburbs, Madetoja began to compose his Third Symphony, Op. 55, and upon returning to Finland in October (due to financial worries), his work on the project continued. The new symphony received its premiere in Helsinki on 8 April 1926, and although Madetoja received the usual praise, the audience and critics found the new work somewhat perplexing: with the monumental, elegiac Second Symphony having set expectations, the optimism and restraint of the Third came as a surprise, its (subsequent) significance eluding nearly everyone. Some years later, the French music writer, Henri-Claude Fantapié, described the cheerful, pastorale Third Symphony as a "sinfonia Gallica" in spirit and explained the premiere as thus: "The listeners expected the opera [The Ostrobothnians] to be followed by a nationalistic anthem and were disappointed to hear something that seemed to them to be hermetic and that, to crown it all, was lacking in pomposity and solemnity … the properties the majority of Finnish music-lovers always expect in a new work." Nevertheless, today the Third Symphony is widely regarded as Madetoja's "masterpiece", the rare Finnish symphony equal in stature to Sibelius's seven essays in the form.

Structure 
The symphony is in four-movements:

Discography 

References 

Symphonies by Leevi Madetoja
20th-century classical music
1926 compositions
Compositions in A major